Charles Frederick Houghton (27 April 1839 – 13 August 1898) was a Canadian rancher, justice of the peace, politician and soldier.

Military career
Born in County Kilkenny, Ireland, Charles Houghton was commissioned into the 57th Foot without purchase in 1855. In 1856 he was promoted lieutenant without purchase, and in 1858 he transferred into the 5th Foot; a month later he transferred into the 20th Foot. In 1861 he purchased a Captaincy. In 1863 he retired from the Army and emigrated to British Columbia, Canada, settling in the Okanagan valley. Through a military land grant, he established Coldstream Ranch that year, later transferring title to fellow officers Forbes George Vernon and Charles Albert Vernon.

Political career
In 1865 and 1866, he led expeditions to explore the Gold Range through to the Columbia River mines. In 1866, he was appointed justice of the peace. After British Columbia entered confederation he was elected to the House of Commons of Canada for the riding of Yale District in 1871.

After being promoted to lieutenant-colonel, he was appointed deputy adjutant-general of the militia for Military District No.11 (British Columbia) in 1873.

In 1877, he commanded a force of 60 men, reinforced by infantry and artillery from New Westminster and the gunboat , in a failed attempt to remove striking colliers from Robert Dunsmuir's Wellington mine. Two years later, Houghton married Dunsmuir's daughter, Marion.

After his marriage and a half-year in Europe, Houghton was transferred to Manitoba where he organised the 90th (Winnipeg) Battalion of Rifles. He was passed over in favour of Major-General Frederick Dobson Middleton for command of the troops charged with suppressing the North-West Rebellion.

External links
 
 
 
Charles Frederick Houghton fonds - Library and Archives Canada

1839 births
1898 deaths
Politicians from County Kilkenny
Middlesex Regiment officers
Lancashire Fusiliers officers
British colonial army officers
Liberal Party of Canada MPs
Members of the House of Commons of Canada from British Columbia
Pre-Confederation British Columbia people
Irish emigrants to pre-Confederation British Columbia
19th-century Anglo-Irish people
Canadian ranchers
Canadian justices of the peace
People of the North-West Rebellion